The Desmond Trannore Bridge is a road bridge that carries the Bruce Highway over the Mulgrave River in Gordonvale, in Far North Queensland, Australia.

The -long bridge is  higher than the former Mulgrave River Bridge, to improve flood immunity during the wet season. The old Mulgrave River Bridge was regularly submerged by flood waters during the wet season.

The construction of the bridge was fast-tracked by installation of 50 precast concrete girders. The bridge was completed as part of a number of projects undertaken by the Australian Government to flood-proof the Bruce Highway and provide all year round access to Far North Queensland.

The bridge is named in honour of Senior Constable Desmond Trannore, local police officer, killed in the line of duty in 1964.

References

Road bridges in Queensland
Buildings and structures in Far North Queensland
2009 establishments in Australia
Bridges completed in 2009
Concrete bridges in Australia
Girder bridges